The Comics Journal is an American magazine of news and criticism published by Fantagraphics Books and pertaining to comic books and strips. Of note are its long and in-depth interviews with artists and writers.

Interview subjects (selection) 
Subjects are listed with the issue number of the interview(s) in parentheses.

 Nick Abadzis (196)
 Jessica Abel (190, 270)
 Neal Adams (43, 72, 100)
 Lalo Alcaraz (270)
 Doug Allen (156)
 Mike Allred (164, 230)
 Axel Alonso (228)
 Ho Che Anderson (160, 300)
 Brent Anderson (91)
 Man Andersson (174)
 Sergio Aragonés (128)
 Gus Arriola (229)
 Tony Auth (118)
 Brian Azzarello (228)
 David Beauchard (275)
 Gabriel Bá (298)
 Art Babbitt (120)
 Peter Bagge (106, 159, 206, 232)
 John Bagnall (122)
 Kyle Baker (219)
 Clive Barker (171)
 Carl Barks (250)
 Mike Baron (110)
 Donna Barr (190)
 Lynda Barry (132, 296)
 Don Baumgart (92)
 Alison Bechdel (179, 237, 282, 300)
 C. C. Beck (95)
 Steve Bell (272)
 Brian Michael Bendis (266)
 Karen Berger (163)
 Brian Biggs (205)
 Enki Bilal (129)
 Murray Bishoff (27)
 Stephen R. Bissette (93, 137, 185)
 Mark Bodé (270)
 Ruben Bolling (247)
 Murray Boltinoff (53, 100)
 Ariel Bordeaux (188)
 Jim Borgman (300)
 Matt Bors (300)
 Robert Boyd (211)
 Pat Boyette (221)
 Berkeley Breathed (125)
 Raymond Briggs (250)
 Mat Brinkman (256)
 Steve Brodner (262)
 Sims Brothers (160)
 Chester Brown (135, 162)
 Jeffrey Brown (287)
 Ed Brubaker (263)
 Ivan Brunetti (264)
 Frank Brunner (51)
 Rich Buckler (88)
 Bob Burden (268)
 Charles Burns (148, 234, 243)
 John Buscema (226)
 Kurt Busiek (188, 216)
 John Byrne (57, 75)
 Eddie Campbell (145, 273)
 Milton Caniff (108)
 Al Capp (54)
 Joe Casey (257)
 Susan Catherine (122)
 Ben Catmull (259)
 Joey Cavalieri (74)
 Michael Chabon (231)
 Paul Chadwick (132, 221)
 Roz Chast (306)
 Howard Chaykin (51, 91, 99, 109, 300)
 Brian Chippendale (256)
 Frank Cho (205)
 Pierre Christin (129)
 Chris Claremont (50, 74, 78, 89, 100, 152)
 Theo Clarke (122)
 Daniel Clowes (154, 188, 233, 250)
 Erika Clowes (234)
 Chynna Clugston Flores (277)
 Gene Colan (231)
 Joe Coleman (170)
 Katherine Collins (99)
 Max Allan Collins (77, 91)
 Nancy A. Collins (163)
 Ernie Colón (285)
 Steve Conley (232)
 Tony Consiglio (197)
 Gerry Conway (69)
 Darwyn Cooke (285)
 Dave Cooper (245)
 Josh Cotter (299)
 Denys Cowan (91)
 Roy Crane (203, 302)
 Sally Cruikshank (307)
 Maxon Crumb (217)
 Robert Crumb (106, 113, 121, 143, 158, 180, 301)
 Sophie Crumb (274)
 Howard Cruse (111, 182)
 Glenn Dakin (238)
 Lloyd Dangle (223)
 Jeff Danziger (272)
 Dame Darcy (171)
 Jack Davis (153, 225)
 John Davis (188)
 Vincent Davis (98)
 Dan DeCarlo (229)
 Dwight R. Decker (73)
 Tom DeFalco (77)
 Gene Deitch (292)
 Kim Deitch (123, 234, 243, 292)
 Seth Deitch (292)
 Simon Deitch (292)
 Samuel R. Delany (48)
 Oleg Dergatchov (206)
 Tom Devlin (211)
 Mike Diana (173)
 Colleen Doran (188)
 Evan Dorkin (152, 214)
 Julie Doucet (141)
 Debbie Drechsler (249)
 Eric Drooker (253)
 Dupuy and Berberian (260)
 Kevin Eastman (202)
 Dennis Eichhorn (162)
 Will Eisner (46, 47, 89, 91, 100, 249, 267)
 Will Elder (177, 254)
 Harlan Ellison (53, 103, 115)
 Hunt Emerson (198)
 Steve Englehart (63, 100)
 Garth Ennis (207)
 Mark Evanier (58, 112, 113)
 George Evans (177)
 Tristan Farnon (232)
 Jules Feiffer (124)
 Al Feldstein (177, 225)
 Bob Fingerman (207)
 Neil Fitzpatrick (238)
 Mary Fleener (166)
 Michael Fleisher (56)
 Shary Flenniken (95, 146)
 Creig Flessel (245)
 HTML Flowers (305)
 Mike Flynn (88)
 Ellen Forney (237)
 Bob Foster (135)
 Hal Foster (102)
 Matt Fraction (300)
 Rudi Franke (58)
 Frank Frazetta (174)
 Kelly Freas (53)
 Renée French (232, 271)
 Drew Friedman (151)
 Mike Friedrich (71, 100)
 Neil Gaiman (155, 163, 169, 188)
 William Gaines (77, 81, 100)
 Fred Gallagher (277)
 Gabby Gamboa (205)
 Ness Garza (307)
 Clay Geerdes (98)
 Steve Geppi (88)
 Steve Gerber (41, 57, 100)
 Dave Gibbons (116, 300)
 Michael T. Gilbert (84)
 Terry Gilliam (182)
 Peter Gillis (91)
 Juan Giménez (94)
 Dick Giordano (62, 68, 77, 100, 119)
 Gipi (295)
 Jean Giraud (118)
 Phoebe Gloeckner (261)
 Mike Gold (88, 91)
 Larry Gonick (224)
 Archie Goodwin (78, 88, 91, 100)
 Floyd Gottfredson (120)
 Ron Goulart (249)
 Alan Grant (122)
 Paul Gravett (122)
 Grass Green (114)
 Justin Green (104)
 Roberta Gregory (168)
 Mike Grell (91)
 Rick Griffin (257)
 Bill Griffith (157, 234)
 Adam Griffiths (304)
 Bus Griffiths (187)
 Matt Groening (141)
 Gary Groth (58, 73, 74, 88, 99, 105, 115, 163)
 Fred Guardineer (282)
 Emmanuel Guibert (297)
 Jackson Guice (91)
 Nicholas Gurewitch (298)
 Nabile Hage (160)
 Moto Hagio (269)
 David Hajdu (296)
 Larry Hama (91)
 V. T. Hamlin (212)
 Myra Hancock (122)
 Bob Haney (276, 278)
 Simon Hanselmann (304)
 Sammy Harkham (259, 300)
 Jack C. Harris (55)
 Sol Harrison (169)
 R. C. Harvey (290)
 Dean Haspiel (197)
 Seitu Hayden (160)
 Russ Heath (117)
 Jeet Heer (290)
 Sam Henderson (209)
 Hergé (250)
 Gilbert Hernandez (126, 178, 258)
 Jaime Hernandez (126, 178, 300)
 Mario Hernandez (126)
 Al Hirschfeld (201)
 Burne Hogarth (166, 167, 184)
 Nicole Hollander (95)
 Dylan Horrocks (243)
 Jay Hosler (261)
 Kevin Huizenga (259, 300, 305)
 Frank Hussey (258)
 Carmine Infantino (191)
 Will Jacobs (110)
 Al Jaffee (225, 301)
 Jason (294)
 Jaxon (61, 75, 77, 100, 213)
 Dave Johnson (228)
 Kikuo Johnson (277)
 Lynn Johnston (217)
 Bruce Jones (91)
 Gerry Jones (110)
 Ted Jouflas (229)
 Wendy Jung (234)
 Jenette Kahn (37)
 Carol Kalish (77)
 Michael Kaluta (103)
 Jack Kamen (240)
 Gil Kane (38, 64, 75, 91, 99, 105, 113, 186, 187, 226)
 Robert Kanigher (85, 86)
 Kaz (186, 243)
 Walt Kelly (140)
 Megan Kelso (188, 216)
 John Kerschbaum (295)
 Chip Kidd (243)
 Derek Kirk Kim (259)
 Ward Kimball (120)
 Jack Kirby (30, 31, 105, 134)
 Rebecca Kirby (305)
 Roz Kirby (105)
 Robert Kirkman (289)
 Denis Kitchen (63, 88)
 Keith Knight (205, 285, 300)
 James Kochalka (189, 222)
 Aline Kominsky-Crumb (139)
 Carol Kovinick-Hernandez (234)
 David Anthony Kraft (35)
 Paul Krassner (199)
 Joe Kubert (91, 172)
 Peter Kuper (150, 276)
 Paul Kupperberg (91)
 Michael Kupperman (244, 301)
 Harvey Kurtzman (67, 91, 100, 153)
 Gary Kwapisz (58)
 Richard Kyle (98)
 Terry LaBan (163)
 Jackie Lait (114)
 Roger Langridge (284)
 Erik Larsen (222)
 Carol Lay (213)
 Peter Ledger (48)
 Stan Lee (42, 103, 181)
 Steve Leialoha (91)
 David Levine (178, 197)
 Paul Levitz (39)
 Alan Light (27)
 Don Lomax (136)
 M.G. Lord (95)
 Mike Luckovich (296)
 Jason Lutes (228)
 Jay Lynch (114)
 Ralph Macchio (48)
 Matt Madden (290)
 Cathy Malkasian (307)
 Milo Manara (182, 198)
 Joey Manley (277)
 Russ Manning (203)
 Larry Marder (201)
 Rick Marschall (48, 52, 58, 91, 100)
 Mark Martin (170, 232)
 Fifi Martinez (303)
 Joe Matt (162, 183, 293)
 Paul Mavrides (167)
 David Mazzucchelli (152, 194, 300)
 Scott McCloud (137, 179, 188, 197, 232)
 Patrick McDonnell (197)
 Todd McFarlane (152)
 Aaron McGruder (255)
 Richard McGuire (243)
 Dave McKean (155, 196)
 Ted McKeever (163)
 Mike McMahon (122)
 Carla Speed McNeil (280)
 Linda Medley (218)
 Jean-Christophe Menu (277, 300)
 George Metzger (87)
 Jean-Claude Mézières (260)
 Dallas Middaugh (277)
 Mike Mignola (189)
 Frank Miller (68, 70, 77, 78, 89, 101, 118, 209)
 Peter Milligan (206)
 Tony Millionaire (215)
 Junko Mizuno (273)
 Yvonne Mojica (197)
 Sheldon Moldoff (214)
 Fábio Moon (298)
 Alan Moore (93, 106, 116, 118, 138, 139, 140, 143, 152, 231)
 Terry Moore (193, 276)
 Grant Morrison (176, 218)
 Richard Morrissey (73)
 Victor Moscoso (246)
 Françoise Mouly (65)
 Dean Mullaney (88, 115)
 Doug Murray (136)
 Keiji Nakazawa (256)
 Rudy Nebres (48)
 Mark Newgarden (161, 253)
 Ann Nocenti (163)
 Diane Noomin (162)
 Howard Nostrand (96)
 Danica Novgorodoff (300)
 Dennis O'Neil (64, 66, 68, 68, 100, 300)
 Kevin O'Neill (122)
 Rick Obadiah (88)
 Chris Oliveros (188)
 Chris Onstad (277)
 Jerry Ordway (91)
 Gary Panter (100, 250)
 Martin Pasko (37, 58)
 Harvey Pekar (97, 162)
 George Pérez (79, 80, 100)
 John Pham (259)
 Donald Phelps (277)
 Woodrow Phoenix (122)
 Lark Pien (259)
 Wendy and Richard Pini (63, 100, 168)
 Wendy Pini (89, 95, 105)
 Ed Pinsent (122)
 Mike Ploog (267, 274)
 Frank Plowright (122)
 Rachel Pollack (163)
 Paul Pope (191, 192)
 John Porcellino (241)
 Stu Potts (58)
 John Pound (306)
 Byron Preiss (153)
 Frank Quitely (296, 300)
 Thomas Radecki (133)
 Ted Rall (206, 247, 300)
 Brian Ralph (256)
 Jordan Raphael (188, 197, 205, 211)
 Gary Reed (188)
 Ron Regé Jr. (252)
 Pierce Rice (219)
 John Ney Rieber (241)
 Leonard Rifas (92)
 Eduardo Risso (228)
 Trina Robbins (53, 95, 100, 223, 251)
 Alex Robinson (197, 293)
 James Robinson (199)
 Jerry Robinson (271, 272)
 Spain Rodriguez (204, 206, 232, 251)
 Marshall Rogers (54, 91, 100)
 John Romita Sr. (252)
 Budd Root (188)
 Donal Rooum (247)
 Don Rosa (183, 184, 185)
 Avis Rosenberg (95)
 Patrick Rosenkranz (264)
 Alex Ross (223, 224)
 Arnold Roth (142)
 Josef Rubinstein (78)
 Greg Rucka (287)
 Steve Rude (248)
 P. Craig Russell (147)
 Johnny Ryan (279, 296)
 Joe Sacco (176, 234, 301)
 Stan Sakai (192, 300)
 Richard Sala (208)
 Tim Sale (291)
 Zak Sally (300)
 David Sandlin (283)
 Buddy Saunders (116)
 Bill Schorr (193, 194, 195)
 Charles M. Schulz (200)
 Diana Schutz (277)
 Mark Schultz (150)
 Monte Schulz (290)
 Julius Schwartz (68)
 Chris Schweizer (300)
 Maurice Sendak (140, 302)
 Seth (162, 183, 193, 234)
 John Severin (215, 216)
 Marie Severin (237)
 Eric Shanower (265)
 Dash Shaw (296, 300)
 Stan Shaw (160)
 Gilbert Shelton (92, 187)
 Jim Shooter (40, 58, 60, 68, 88, 115)
 Noel Sickles (242)
 Mark Siegel (277)
 Bill Sienkiewicz (91, 107)
 Robert Sikoryak (255)
 Dave Sim (82, 83, 91, 100, 130, 184, 192)
 Deni Sim (82, 83)
 Posy Simmonds (286)
 Josh Simmons (291)
 Julie Simmons (49)
 Joe Simon (134)
 Gail Simone (286)
 Louise Simonson (68, 74)
 Walt Simonson (99)
 Donald Simpson (143)
 Roger Slifer (91)
 Jeff Smith (173, 218)
 Kenneth Smith (48, 100, 105, 210)
 Edward Sorel (158)
 Bill Spicer (98)
 Art Spiegelman (65, 145, 180, 181, 243, 300)
 Tom Spurgeon (188)
 Frank Stack (189, 297)
 John Stanley (250)
 Chris Staros (211, 277)
 Joe Staton (45, 100)
 Ralph Steadman (131)
 Jay Stephens (212)
 Dave Stevens (117)
 Jan Strnad (77, 88)
 Nadine Strossen (188)
 James Sturm (251)
 Tom Sutton (230)
 Curt Swan (73)
 Joost Swarte (181, 279)
 Maria Sweeney (305)
 Bryan Talbot (194)
 Jacques Tardi (302)
 Mark Tatulli (294)
 Roy Thomas (61, 68, 71)
 Craig Thompson (258, 268)
 Jill Thompson (244)
 Kim Thompson (74)
 Frank Thorne (280)
 Stan Timmons (37)
 Seth Tobocman (233, 276)
 Fred Todd (92)
 Tom Toles (195)
 Adrian Tomine (205)
 Tom Tomorrow (165)
 Roy Tompkins (203)
 Mark Tonra (246)
 Alex Toth (98, 262, 277)
 John Totleben (93)
 Lewis Trondheim (283)
 Timothy Truman (144)
 Carol Tyler (142)
 Kazuo Umezu (254)
 Tomi Ungerer (303)
 Brian K. Vaughan (295)
 Rick Veitch (175, 232)
 Charles Vess (91, 218)
 Trevor Von Eeden (91, 298)
 John Wagner (122)
 Martin Wagner (173, 188)
 Matt Wagner (165)
 Mort Walker (116, 297)
 Reed Walker (143)
 Chris Ware (200, 243)
 Marnie Ware (234)
 Brett Warnok (211)
 Andi Watson (248)
 Bill Watterson (127)
 Georgia Webber (305)
 Len Wein (48, 58, 68, 91, 100)
 Drew Weing (259)
 Steven Weissman (205)
 Fredric Wertham (133)
 John Weston (122)
 Shannon Wheeler (204)
 Mack White (203)
 Ted White (59)
 Malcolm Whyte (251)
 Robert Williams (161, 253)
 Al Williamson (90, 100)
 Skip Williamson (104)
 Bill Willingham (278)
 Mary Wilshire (91, 95)
 S. Clay Wilson (251, 293)
 Gahan Wilson (156)
 Barry Windsor-Smith (190)
 Marv Wolfman (44, 58, 79, 80, 91, 100)
 Wally Wood (197)
 Jim Woodring (164)
 Kent Worcester (290)
 John Workman (49, 100)
 Kate Worley (143)
 Bernie Wrightson (76, 100)
 Gene Luen Yang (284)
 Phil Yeh (87)
 Craig Yoe (114)
 Garrett Young (306)
 Minou Zaribaf (237)
 Dan Zettwoch (259)
 Jay Zilber (37)
 Fabio Zimbres (188)
 Aleksandar Zograf (192)
 Ray Zone (102)
 Terry Zwigoff (179)

External links
The Comics Journal – Official website

Comics Journal, The: Interview subjects
Comics-related lists
Interviews